Chaxi Town is an urban town in and subdivision of Xinhua County, Hunan Province, People's Republic of China.

Administrative division
The town is divided into 28 villages and one community, the following areas: Zhaohui Community, Chaoyang Village, Lebai Village, Zhenghui Village, Menggongling Village, Shimenkou Village, Tiandangyuan Village, Yangjiabian Village, Xinqun Village, Shizhapai Village, Fengyang Village, Shihetang Village, Niao'ao Village, Fumin Village, Hengjiang Village, Banshanjie Village, Shuangshu Village, Hongyanqiao Village, Rixing Village, Mugua Village, Bixi Village, Houxi Village, Shengnong Village, Jinxi Village, Yuanzhu Village, Benteng Village, Youping Village, Shuangxi Village, and Zhushanwan Village. (朝辉社区、朝阳村、乐柏村、政辉村、孟公岭村、石门口村、田凼院村、杨家边村、新群村、石渣牌村、凤阳村、石禾塘村、鸟坳村、福民村、横江村、半山街村、双曙村、红岩桥村、日星村、木瓜村、碧溪村、厚溪村、胜农村、金溪村、源竹村、奔腾村、油坪村、双溪村、竹山湾村).

References

External links

Divisions of Xinhua County